Yavuz Turgul  is a Turkish film director and screenwriter, known for his box-office hit The Bandit (1996).

Early life and education 
Yavuz Turgul graduated from the Istanbul University Institute of Journalism and worked as a journalist for six years for Ses magazine before he began to write scripts.

Film career

Turgul achieved early success in the late 70s and early 80s with scripts for a series of popular comedy productions from producer-director Ertem Eğilmez and director Kartal Tibet including Tosun Paşa (1976), Sultan (1978) and Hababam Sınıfı Güle Güle (1981).

He went on to greater success in the 80s by winning the Golden Orange for Best Screenplay for Abbas in Flower (1982), directed by Sinan Çetin, making his directorial debut with Fahriye Abla (1984) and winning the Golden Orange for Best Screenplay a second time for The Agha (1985), directed by Nesli Çölgeçen before cementing his success by winning Golden Oranges for Best Film and Best Screenplay as well as prizes at film festivals in Istanbul and San Sebastián for his second directorial effort Mr. Muhsin (1987), which according to Rekin Teksoy, "is considered his most important film".

In the 90s he continued with The Unforgettable Director of Love Movies (1990) and  The Shadow Play (1992), for which he won Golden Oranges for 2nd Best Film and Best Screenplay, before achieving his greatest box office success to date with the popular The Bandit (1996), which according to Rekin Teksoy, "brought in Turkish audiences back into their seats," and made him,"a pioneer of the box-office hits during this period," as well as the recipient of the Golden Dolphin at the Festróia - Tróia International Film Festival.

He returned following a long absence with Lovelorn (2005), which won the Queens Spirit Award, and wrote For Love and Honor (2007), directed by Ömer Vargı, which was released the same year he received a Golden Orange Lifetime Achievement Award. His latest film Hunting Season was released on 3 December 2010.

Awards
Turgul won the Golden Orange for Best Screenplay four times for Abbas in Flower (1982), The Agha (1985), Mr. Muhsin (1987) and The Shadow Play (1992); Golden Oranges for Best Film for Mr. Muhsin (1987) and 2nd Best Film for Gölge Oyunu (1992); and a Golden Orange Lifetime Achievement Award.

Filmography

References

External links 
 

1946 births
Turkish film directors
Turkish male screenwriters
Best Screenplay Golden Orange Award winners
Golden Orange Life Achievement Award winners
Living people